Father and Son (Chinese: 父子雄兵) is a 2017 Chinese comedy film directed by Yuan Weidong (Chinese: 袁卫东) and starring Da Peng, Fan Wei, Zhang Tian'ai, Qiao Shan, Vivian Wu and Simon Yam.

Plot
Fan Xiaobing, a seemingly successful businessman, is a loser and a conman in real life. He has an awful relationship with his father Fan Yingxiong, who used to serve in the army. To pay back the debt from gangsters, Xiaobing comes up with a terrible plan: claiming his dad has died and then collecting condolence money. In order to hold a fake funeral, Xiaobing tricks his father Yingxiong to leave the city for a travel. But Yingxiong returns unexpectedly and puts this farce to an end. Gangsters take Xiaobing to Macao to take his life. Yingxiong decides to go to Macao with his old comrades to save the son.

Cast
Da Peng as Fan Xiaobing
Fan Wei as Fan Yingxiong
Zhang Tian'ai
Qiao Shan
Vivian Wu
Simon Yam

References

External links

Father and Son on Douban

Chinese comedy films
2017 films
2010s Mandarin-language films
2017 comedy films